Norman "Rusty" Wescoatt (August 2, 1911 – September 3, 1987) was an American supporting actor who appeared in over 80 films between 1947 and 1965.

Early life
The son of Mr. and Mrs. W.W. Wescoatt, he was born on August 2, 1911, in Maui, Hawaii, U.S. He played football at McKinley High School and at the University of Hawaii.

Wescoatt spoke Hawaiian, Chinese, and Japanese.

Athletics
On July 4, 1933, Wescoatt won his initial match as a professional wrestler, debuting in Honolulu, Hawaii. He went on to wrestle in New York, Boston, and other eastern cities, amassing a total of nearly 200 matches, 90 percent of which he won, by September 1936. Also in September 1936, he signed a contract with a new manager to move up to "a tour of some of the larger wrestling centers."

On Easter Sunday 1935, he set a record by swimming across the San Francisco Bay in two hours, 5 minutes.

Acting
Wescoatt began his acting career with The Vigilante in 1947 as Garrity (uncredited). His next serial was The Sea Hound as Singapore Manson. In 1948, Wescoatt was in Superman, a 15-part black-and-white Columbia film serial, based on the comic book character Superman as Elton in chapters 7–15. In 1948, he was in Congo Bill as Ivan. He played a number of henchmen roles in B-Westerns and serials. Wescoatt's main studio for serial mayhem was Columbia. His screen persona was usually a bully who, often had more brawn than brains, did the physical labor according to the strict orders given by the brains heavy.  
 
In 1950, Wescoatt was uncredited as Maklee Native in Jungle Manhunt. In 1955, he was in Gang Busters as Mike Denike (archive footage). Also in 1955, he was in Tarantula, a science fiction film from Universal-International, produced by William Alland, directed by Jack Arnold, as a driver (uncredited).

Wescoatt guest starred in a number of television shows including The Adventures of Kit Carson, The Lone Ranger, Death Valley Days,  Hopalong Cassidy, Adventures of Wild Bill Hickok, Buffalo Bill, Jr., Sergeant Preston of the Yukon, Sky King, Gunsmoke, Perry Mason, 77 Sunset Strip, Maverick, Bat Masterson, The Twilight Zone, Lawman, and The Legend of Jesse James.

Later years 
In the 1960s, Wescoatt operated food markets in San Diego and Los Angeles.

Death
Wescoatt died on September 3, 1987, in Los Angeles, California, at the age of 76.

Selected appearances

Films

TV shows
The Adventures of Kit Carson (1952-1953) - Tom / Milt / Henchman / Big Henchman / Gustavo Morales aka Chico Grande
The Lone Ranger (1952) - Sergeant
Death Valley Days (1952-1959) - Rusty / Stoney / Finn / Fireman / Pete / Barkeeper / Red / Townsman / Hank Lewis / Frank / Charlie Flack / Barfly / Dirk
The Gene Autry Show (1953) - Henchman Ed / Cole, Beefy Henchman in Checked Shirt
Hopalong Cassidy (1953) - Brawler in Bank
The Roy Rogers Show (1953-1957) - Henchman Pete / Henchman Hal Jessup / Lefty Young / Henchman Hank / Fred Willow / Joe Burnside / Outlaw Leader
Adventures of Wild Bill Hickok (1953-1958) - Fake Red Beard / Ben
Captain Midnight (1954) - Davis
Buffalo Bill, Jr. (1955) - Wagon DriverSergeant Preston of the Yukon (1956) - One Punch MadiganThe Adventures of Rin Tin Tin (1955-1958) - Portchey / Clem Wharton / WindomSky King (1956–1959) - Varner / Red Forrest / Second Man / Frisco / PeteGunsmoke (1957) - GereTales of the Texas Rangers (1957) - BlackiePerry Mason (1957) - Sgt. Holcomb77 Sunset Strip (1958) - Garbage ManMaverick (1958-1960) - Referee / Muldoon / Ben Thompson / Gang Member / Gus Shaughnessy / Burly Stagecoach PassengerBat Masterson (1959-1960) - Henchman / Kickapoo SmithThe Twilight Zone (1960) - Tall ManSurfside 6 (1960) - Pug GarnesLawman (1962) - BlacksmithThe Legend of Jesse James'' (1965) - Blacksmith (final appearance)

References

External links

American male film actors
American male television actors
1911 births
1987 deaths
20th-century American male actors